The Karatmeter is a scientific instrument which uses X-rays to give an exact reading of the purity of gold. The Karatmeter is also referred to as a X-Ray fluorescence (XRF) spectrometer. Due to its very high precision and fast result, X-ray analysis has been adopted by international agencies in India as part of the certification process used to hallmark gold. It is an accurate, non-destructive means of testing the purity of gold and other related elements. Analyzing gold using XRF spectrometers gives the purity of gold, up to 10-12 microns and hence it gives the analysis of coating only.

Using this technique, the precise percentage or karat (of karat) in a solid piece of jewelry can be determined in 30 seconds. It also accurately (up to 10-12 microns) determines the element composition of all types of gold, white gold, platinum, silver, palladium, rhodium and related alloys.

Energy dispersive X-Ray fluorescence (ED-XRF) is a simple, accurate and economic analytical methods for the determination of the chemical composition of many types of materials. It is non-destructive and reliable, requires very little sample preparation and is suitable for solid, liquid and powdered samples. It can be used for a wide range of elements, from Chlorine (17) to Uranium (92), and provides detection limits at the sub-ppm level.

There are many models of Gold Purity Testing machines available - from portable (light weight) to industrial grade machines.

Apart from X-ray spectrometer technique, other older traditional methods are using the TouchStone and Acid to test the gold purity. But TouchStone and Acid are destructive testing - a tiny sample of gold is cut and then tested. The sample is rubbed on TouchStone and a drop of acid is put on it and the goldsmith observes the residue using a magnifying lens. Based on experience, gold smith can determine purity of sample.

References

Gold
Measuring instruments